The 2016 election of the Ceann Comhairle took place on 10 March 2016 at the commencement of the 32nd Dáil. It was the first election to be performed by secret ballot.

Rules
Under the new rules for the election of the Ceann Comhairle, introduced during the ante-penultimate sitting of the 31st Dáil on 28 January 2016, candidates must be nominated by at least seven members of Dáil Éireann. Each member was allowed to nominate only one candidate. Nominations had to be submitted to the Clerk of the Dáil by 18:00 on 9 March 2016 in order to be valid, but could be withdrawn at any time up to the close of nominations.

As more than one candidate was nominated, the Dáil voted by secret ballot in order of preference after the candidates' speeches, with an absolute majority required for victory. As no candidate won a majority on first preferences, the individual with the fewest votes was eliminated and their votes redistributed in accordance with their next highest preference, under the single transferable vote system. Eliminations and redistributions continued until one member received the requisite absolute majority. Then, the House voted on a formal motion to appoint the member in question to the position of Ceann Comhairle. The Clerk of the Dáil was the presiding officer of the House during the election process.

Candidates
The Ceann Comhairle of the 31st Dáil, Seán Barrett, said he would not seek re-election to the position. Fine Gael's John Deasy was reported to be interested in the role. Fianna Fáil selected Seán Ó Fearghaíl as their candidate at a parliamentary meeting on 7 March 2016. Ó Fearghaíl overcame Pat "the Cope" Gallagher, John McGuinness, Michael Moynihan and Brendan Smith to get the nomination. Sinn Féin selected Caoimhghín Ó Caoláin. The Independent Alliance was also reported to be in "serious discussions" about selecting a candidate. Maureen O'Sullivan emerged as a contender after she announced her interest in the role and was named favourite to succeed by The Irish Times.

Result

Notes

References 

2016 elections in the Republic of Ireland
2016 in Irish politics
March 2016 events in Ireland
2016
32nd Dáil